Elizabeth Yoffe is an independent media producer and the former producing partner of award-winning filmmaker Tony Zierra.

Yoffe is the producer of the acclaimed documentary Filmworker about Leon Vitali who was the assistant to director Stanley Kubrick. Filmworker premiered as an official selection at the 2017 Cannes Film Festival and also was an official selection at many domestic and international film festivals such as Telluride Film Festival, the New York Film Festival, BFI London Film Festival, CPH:DOX, Sydney Film Festival and many others. The film has received a 95% rating on Rotten Tomatoes. Yoffe produced the award-winning documentary My Big Break, directed by Tony Zierra, a cautionary tale about the darker side of celebrity and the consequences of fame that has received consistently strong reviews and has been repeatedly praised for its unusually candid look at the effects of success on young rising stars in Hollywood.  My Big Break won Best Documentary at the Boston Film Festival, Best Documentary at Artsfest, Pennsylvania, was nominated for Best Documentary at the Raindance Film Festival in London and was an Official Selection of The American Cinematic Experience Festival.

Yoffe also produced USA The Movie, a film that merges reality and fiction to explore the cyclical nature of violence and retaliation in the wake of the September 11 attacks. The film was the subject of an in-depth analysis by academic and commentator Dion Dennis.  She co-produced Carving Out Our Name, an Official Selection at Toronto International Film Festival. She also produced the award-winning Independent Film Channel favorite Brightness starring Eric Idle, Chad Lindberg and Fay Masterson.

Yoffe received a B.A. in Theater Arts from Bennington College and an M.A. in Education from Antioch University, Seattle. She worked as a regional casting director for many film and television projects including Waiting For The Light directed by Christopher Monger starring Shirley MacLaine, Dogfight directed by Nancy Savoca starring River Phoenix and David Lynch’s classic series, Twin Peaks. In Los Angeles she served as president of Cinewomen L.A.,a non-profit organization dedicated to advancing the role of women in film.

Her writing has appeared in various magazines and newspapers including The New York Times and Slate.

References

External links 

Filmworker
 My Big Break

Living people
American film producers
Year of birth missing (living people)
Bennington College alumni
Antioch University alumni
Place of birth missing (living people)